Edward Hay may refer to: 

Edward Hay (diplomat) (fl. 1700s), British diplomat and Governor of Barbados
Edward Hay (County Wexford) (1761–1826), author of a book on the Irish Rebellion of 1798
Edward Hay (politician) (1840–1918), politician in Manitoba, Canada
Lord Edward Hay (1888–1944), British soldier 
Edward Norman Hay (1889–1943), composer and musicologist
Edward N. Hay (died 1958), businessman based in Philadelphia, Pennsylvania
Edward Hay, 13th Marquess of Tweeddale (1947–2005)

See also
Edward Drummond-Hay (antiquarian) (1785–1845), British antiquarian and diplomat
Edward Drummond-Hay (Royal Navy officer) (1815–1884), British naval officer, diplomat and colonial administrator
Edward Hayes (disambiguation)
Edward Hays (disambiguation)